is a French-language opera by Philippe Hersant to a libretto by Jorge Silva Melo (born 1948) based on the novel Le Château des Carpathes by Jules Verne. The opera was performed in concert in 1992, first fully staged in 1993, in a staging by André Wilms, then again in 1994.

Roles
 La Stilla: Sylvie Valayre
 L'Aubergiste: Isabel Garcisanz
 Franz de Télek: Christer Bladin
 Baron de Garz: Marcel Vanaud

Recording
 Le Château des Carpathes, original cast: Sylvie Valayre, Isabel Garcisanz, Christer Bladin, Marcel Vanaud, Orchestre Philharmonique de Montpellier, David Robertson (conductor) 2-CD album. Accord 1993

References

Operas
1992 operas
French-language operas
Operas based on novels
Adaptations of works by Jules Verne